Macrobunus is a genus of tangled nest spiders first described by Albert Tullgren in 1901.

Species
 it contains five species:
Macrobunus backhauseni (Simon, 1896) – Chile, Argentina
Macrobunus caffer (Simon, 1898) – South Africa
Macrobunus chilensis (Simon, 1889) – Chile
Macrobunus madrynensis (Tullgren, 1901) – Argentina
Macrobunus multidentatus (Tullgren, 1902) – Chile

References

External links

Amaurobiidae
Araneomorphae genera
Spiders of South America